William George "Willie" Fay (12 November 1872 – 27 October 1947) was an actor and theatre producer who was one of the co-founders of the Abbey Theatre.

Fay was born in Dublin, where he attended  Belvedere College. He worked for a time in the 1890s with a touring theatre company in Ireland, Scotland, and Wales. When he returned to Dublin, he worked with his older brother Frank, staging productions in halls around the city. Finally, they formed W. G. Fay's Irish National Dramatic Company, focused on the development of Irish acting talent. The brothers participated in founding the Abbey Theatre and were largely responsible for evolving the Abbey style of acting. After a falling-out with the Abbey directors in 1908, the brothers emigrated to the United States to work in theatre there.

He moved to London in 1914, working as an actor on stage and in films. One of his most notable film roles was as Father Tom in Carol Reed's Belfast-set Odd Man Out (1947), whose cast was dense with actors from the Abbey Theatre. His memoir, The Fays of the Abbey Theatre, appeared in 1935. Willie Fay died in London in 1947, aged 74.

Filmography

References

Bibliography
Igoe, Vivien. A Literary Guide to Dublin. (Methuen, 1994) 
Ryan, Philip B. The Lost Theatres of Dublin. (The Badger Press, 1998)

External links
 
 

1872 births
1947 deaths
Abbey Theatre
Irish male stage actors
Irish male film actors
Male actors from Dublin (city)
People educated at Belvedere College
Theatre people from Dublin (city)